Luis Alfonso Solorio Gutiérrez (born 1 August 1994) is a Mexican professional footballer who last played as a centre-back for Tampico Madero.

Honours
Mexico U17
FIFA U-17 World Cup: 2011

References

External links
 
 

Living people
1994 births
Mexican footballers
Mexico youth international footballers
Association football defenders
C.D. Guadalajara footballers
Coras de Nayarit F.C. footballers
Club Atlético Zacatepec players
Cafetaleros de Chiapas footballers
Ascenso MX players
Liga Premier de México players
Tercera División de México players
Footballers from Guadalajara, Jalisco